The ANS synthesizer is a photoelectronic musical instrument created by Russian engineer Evgeny Murzin from 1937 to 1957. The technological basis of his invention was the method of graphical sound recording used in cinematography (developed in Russia concurrently with USA), which made it possible to obtain a visible image of a sound wave, as well as to realize the opposite goal—synthesizing a sound from an artificially drawn sound spectrogram.

In this case the sine waves generated by the ANS are printed onto five glass discs using a process that Murzin (an optical engineer) had to develop himself. Each disc has 144 individual tracks printed onto it, for a total of 720 microtones (discrete pitches), spanning 10 octaves. This yields a resolution of 1/72 octave (16.67 cents). The modulated light from these wheels is then projected onto the back of the synthesizer's interface. These are arranged in a continuous swath vertically, with low frequencies at the bottom and high frequencies at the top.

The user interface consists of a glass plate covered in non-drying opaque black mastic, which constitutes a drawing surface upon which the user makes marks by scratching through the mastic, and therefore allowing light to pass through at that point. 

On the horizontal axis of the score, the time is plotted. The vertical axis is the pitch of the sounds on a logarithmic scale, i.e. the tempered scale of pure sinusoidal tones. The optical slit of the pure tone generator is located behind the score along the vertical pitch axis. Light beams modulated with pure tones are projected onto the optical slit. On the other side of the glass of the score is placed a reading photocell. The glass of the score can be moved in the direction of the time axis. Along the optical slit of the generator, all pure tones have the same width, and each tone occupies a definite geometric place according to the logarithmic scale of the pitch of sounds.

In front of the glass plate sits a vertical bank of twenty photocells that send signals to twenty amplifiers and bandpass filters, each with its own gain adjust control. It is akin to a ten-octave equalizer with two knobs per octave. The ANS is fully polyphonic and will generate all 720 pitches simultaneously if required (a vertical scratch would accomplish this).

The glass plate can then be scanned left or right in front of the photocell bank in order to transcribe the drawing directly into pitches. In other words, it plays what one has drawn, similar to how a score is written. This process can be aided with a gear-motor drive (similar to an engineering lathe) or it can be moved manually. The scan speed is adjustable down to zero. The speed at which the score scans has no relation to pitch but serves only as a means of controlling duration.

Murzin named his invention in honour of the composer Alexander Nikolayevich Scriabin (ANS): Scriabin (1872–1915) was an occultist, theosophist, and early exponent of color-sound theories in composition. The synthesizer was housed in the electronic-music studio situated above the Scriabin Museum (just off of the Arbat in central Moscow) before moving to the basement of the central university on the corner of Bolshaya Nikitskaya. It was saved from the scrapheap thanks to Stanislav Kreichi, who persuaded the university to look after it.

The ANS was used by Stanislav Kreichi, Alfred Schnittke, Edison Denisov, Sofia Gubaidulina, and other Soviet composers. Edward Artemiev wrote many of his scores of the movies of Andrei Tarkovsky with the help of the ANS. Of particular note is Artemiev's score of Tarkovsky's Solaris in which the ANS was used to abstract, sci-fi effect akin to ambient music.

After several years at the Theremin Center, the ANS (there is only one—the original was destroyed and this is the improved version) is now located in the Glinka State Central Museum of Musical Culture in Moscow.

Recordings
An album of works by the composers mentioned above, called "Musical Offering" was released on Melodiya (C60 30721 000) in 1990—although the recordings date from the 1960s and 1970s. Recordings by Stanislav Kreichi—"Ansiana" and "Voices and Movement"—as well as earlier works ("Electroshock Presents: Electroacoustic Music") that used the synthesizer are available on Electroshock Records. A soundtrack of the film Into Space (1961) in collaboration with Edward Artimiev remains unreleased. In 2002, BBC Radio 4 broadcast a program about the ANS by Isobel Clouter as part of her Soundhunter series. In 2004, the British experimental group Coil released CoilANS, a boxed set of experimental drone music performed on the ANS. The Norwegian artist Zweizz released a cassette in 2007 on which side B is made entirely out of ANS recordings. The British experimental group T.A.G.C. utilized sounds generated on the ANS on two compositions that were released in 1996 on the Deepnet compilation album.

Virtual ANS
The ANS has been simulated by developer Alexander Zolotov in his software, Virtual ANS. Written in Pixilang, the app is supported by Windows, Mac OS X, Linux, Apple iOS and Android. Now in its third major version, the simulator's stable release was in 2019.

See also
 List of Russian inventions
 Variophone (1930)
 Oramics (1957)
 Hugh Le Caine — a Canadian engineer who realized a similar instrument using electronic oscillators (Oscillator Bank), in 1959.

Footnotes

References

Bibliography

Synthesizers
Soviet inventions
Russian inventions
Russian electronic musical instruments
Graphical sound
optoelectronics